This is the list of current Olympic records in short track speed skating.

Men's records

Women's records
♦ denotes a performance that is also a current world record.

Mixed records

See also 
 List of Olympic records in speed skating

References

Short track speed skating
Records
Speed skating-related lists